The men's openweight competition at the 2006 Asian Games in Doha was held on 5 December 2006 at the Qatar SC Indoor Hall. Kim Sung-bum won the gold medal.

Schedule
All times are Arabia Standard Time (UTC+03:00)

Results

Main bracket

Repechage

References
Results

External links
Official website

M999
Judo at the Asian Games Men's Openweight